Osman Bejtullah Agë Kuka, also known as Oso Kuka (c. 1812/1820–1862), was an Albanian border guard in the Ottoman-Montenegrin border. Surrounded by Montenegrin soldiers in a tower on the island of Vranjina, he blew it up killing himself and many of the Montenegrin soldiers. In the following decades, he became a rallying figure of the Albanian independence movement and a much-celebrated character of important works in Albanian literature.

Background 
Two Decades earlier, several battles had been fought over the possession of the island, primarily between Ottoman forces, joined by Albanians, and Montenegrins. Between 1835-1844, various rebellions among Albanian highlanders against the Porte led to the enforcement of local Albanian interests. On October 16, 1843, Ottoman forces numbering 12000, led by the Governor of Shkodër, seized the island. The Ottomans arrived at the lake with 50-60 Cannons and opened fire against the Montenegrin troops in the tower. The Ottomans blew up the tower, killing 7 and wounding 18 which were captured. The Ottomans also seized the tower Lesendra, with 10-12000 troops, the Montenegrins numbering 200, fled and were met with harsh criticism by their countrymen. The Montenegrins tried under Petar II Petrović-Njegoš to reclaim the island several times but failed. In 1844, Albanian highlanders from Shkodër sailed with 4 ships to the island of Vranjina to built barracks in order to resist Montenegrin forces.

Life 
Born around 1812 or 1820 in Shkodër, in a timariot family. His family also held several other positions in the Sanjak of Scutari, his grandfather and other relatives were kethüda of the castle. His father, Bejtullah agë Kuka, was standard-bearer of the Albanian Pasha and Vezir, Mustafa Pasha of Shkodra of the powerful Bushati dynasty.
At 1859 due to the proposition of the Albanian Ottoman commander Hodo Sokoli, Oso Kuka was promoted yüzbaşı of the border guards on the Ottoman-Montenegrin border. 

Oso Kuka himself had formed a 24-man band (çetë) that was active in the city. At the head of a small group, Oso Kuka arrived on the battlefields where 8,000 Montenegrin soldiers had been besieging the fort of Vranjina. Kuka and his groups were defending a secondary tower in front of the main tower. When it was surrounded, instead of surrendering, Kuka planted explosives in the tower, which he activated when the Montenegrins stormed the tower and killed hundreds of Montenegrin soldiers along with his group. His bravery made possible that Vranina continued to be under Albanian control up to 1879, when the Congress of Berlin ceded it to Montenegro.

Legacy 
Oso Kuka over the decades became a major rallying figure of the Albanian national awakening. One of the most important representations of Oso Kuka in literature is that in Gjergj Fishta's epic Lahuta e Malcis. Oso Kuka's involvement in the war and his death comprise the first five cantos also known as the "cycle of Oso Kuka". Ndre Zadeja also wrote a melodrama titled Oso Kuka, based on his life.

His residence in Shkodër houses the city's historical museum, while Slavic speaking population of the small village in Vranjina (modern-day Montenegro) show to visitors so-called "house of Oso Kuka".

Sources

External links
 http://www.bksh.al/gsdl/collect/revistaa/tmp/190106.html "Newspaper from 1896 by Faik Bey Konica"
 http://shkoder.net/oso_kuka/ "Oso Kuka – A Great Hero"
 http://argophilia.com/albania/lake-skadar.html "Lake Skadar"
 http://dome.mit.edu/bitstream/handle/1721.3/147464/204131_cp.jpg?sequence=1 "House of Oso Kuka"

19th-century births
1862 deaths
19th-century Albanian people
People from Shkodër
Activists of the Albanian National Awakening
19th-century people from the Ottoman Empire
Albanians from the Ottoman Empire
19th-century Albanian military personnel
People from Scutari vilayet